The M2 High-Speed Tractor (or colloquially M2 Cletrac) was an aircraft tug used by the United States Army Air Forces from 1942.

Construction

The M2 is a fully tracked vehicle designed to tow aircraft on primitive airfields.

History
The M2 was standardized in February 1941 as Medium Tractor M2.

Surviving artifacts
Surviving examples are at the Estrella Warbird Museum, the Wright Museum, the AAF Museum in Danville, VA, Overloon, the Pima Air & Space Museum, the Evergreen Aviation & Space Museum, the Yanks Air Museum, Chino CA, the March Field Air Museum in Riverside CA, The National WWII Museum in New Orleans, Bright's Pioneer Museum, Plainsburg CA, two at the Danville Armour Museum, Danville, VA, and one privately held in Belton, SC, USA. Abroad, one can be found, in perfect condition, at the American Air Museum, in Duxford (UK).

See also
 List of U.S. military vehicles by supply catalog designation
 List of U.S. military vehicles by model number
 M4 Tractor
MB-2 Tow Tractor
Omni Directional Vehicle
U-30 Tow Tractor

References

External links

Cletrac M-2 High Speed Tractor (HST) – Olive-Drab
Photo Album - Cletrac MG-1, MG-2, MG-3 Pictures – Cletrac.org

Military vehicles introduced from 1940 to 1944
Military vehicles of the United States
World War II vehicles of the United States
Aircraft ground handling
Tractors
Aviation ground support equipment